A. K. M. Shahidul Haque was a Bangladeshi police officer who served as the 26th Inspector General of Bangladesh Police.

Career
Haque was born in Narkalikata, Naria, Shariatpur District to a Bengali Muslim family. He joined Bangladesh Police in 1986 as an assistant superintendent. He held other positions, which include Police Commissioner, Dhaka Metropolitan Police, DIG Chittagong Range, DIG Rajshahi Range, DIG (Finance and Development), Police Headquarters, SP Sirajganj, Chittagong, Moulvibazar and Chandpur. Before promoted to IGP, he was Additional IGP (Administration and Operations) at the status of Secretary of Bangladesh Police.

Haque served in three UN peace keeping missions, in Cambodia, Angola and Sudan, and was awarded the UN Peace Medal for his performance.

Writings 
Haque is the author of different books like - 1. Police and Community with Concept of Community Policing, 2. Community Policing Ki Ebong Keno 3. Somaje Police Ebong Community Policing 4. Bangladesh Police Sarrgrontho 5. Community Policing: Concept, Aims and Objectives and 6. Bangladesh Police Hand Book etc.

References

Living people
Inspectors General of Police (Bangladesh)
Date of birth missing (living people)
Year of birth missing (living people)
Bangladeshi police chiefs
Bangladeshi police officers
People from Naria Upazila